Happy Valley Beijing is an amusement park in Beijing, built and operated by Beijing OCT, which is part of the Overseas Chinese Town Company. The park is located in Chaoyang District in eastern Beijing. Opened in July 2006, it is the second park of the Happy Valley theme park chain. The concept design and master plan for the park was created by Creative Kingdom China and Leisure Quest International (USA/China).  Similar in style to the Disneyland Park, Happy Valley Beijing also features distinctive landscapes and themes throughout the resort. In total there are more than 40 rides, 10 of which are extreme rides, and an IMAX theater with seven screens as well as a shopping complex.

History 
On July 29, 2006, Happy Valley Beijing, which was built by Shenzhen Overseas Chinese Town Group in four years, officially opened its park. It was composed of Fjord Forest, Atlantis, Lost Maya, Aegean Port, Shangri-La, and Ant Kingdom.

On August 16, 2007, the large-scale dance poem "Golden Face Dynasty" was performed. In October 2007, the first International Magic Festival of the Happy Valley opened in Beijing, and was subsequently held during the National Day every year. In addition to inviting magicians from all over the world to perform, visitors are also invited to participate in zero-distance magic interaction.

On June 27, 2010, phase II of Beijing Happy Valley, the "happy time zone", became fully operational. It introduced large-scale automobile amusement equipment to provide a racing experience.

On May 31, 2014, the third phase of Happy Valley in Beijing opened, with 500 million yuan being spent to create a 50,000 square meter marine culture theme. An indoor theme venue and an indoor theme rafting "happy world" was launched. A stunt sitcom titled "The three Swallow" full of the charm of old Beijing was staged in the Lost Maya district. After the opening of the third phase, Beijing Happy Valley divides the staff uniforms into various types according to the work they did and the cultural background of the area of the park they worked in. 

Beijing Happy Valley phase IV, the dessert Kingdom, was officially opened on May 1st, 2018. The area cost 1 billion yuan to build, and covers an area of nearly 100,000 square meters, containing 13 amusement projects. It joined the domestic original animation IP "Cookie Police Chief". 

The fifth phase of Happy Valley Beijing, the Shangri-La District, was opened on June 28, 2019.

Areas

Happy Valley Beijing consists of six themed areas, including Atlantis, Ant Kingdom, Aegean Sea, Firth Forest, Lost Maya, and Shangri-La. In total there are more than 40 rides (10 of which are extreme rides), an IMAX theater complex (with seven screens) as well as a shopping complex.

Atlantis is the focal point of the park with its towering Crystal City acting as the central portal. Its theme revolves around the discovery of the legendary lost city of Atlantis. Other themes include:

 The Aegean Sea uses Greek culture, its history, and mythology as its featuring theme.
 Lost Maya uses the lost civilization of the Maya empire as its backdrop theme.
 Shangri-La uses Tibetan and South Western China as its backdrop theme.
 The Ant Kingdom uses fictional cartoon Ant characters as its backdrop theme.

Notable rides

Ticket Information 
Full-price ticket 260 yuan / person

★ "Full-price ticket" objects: children and adults over 1.4 meters tall.

Child ticket 195 yuan/person

★ Definition of "child ticket": children with a height of 1.1 meters (including 1.1 meters) to 1.4 meters (including 1.4 meters);

Elderly ticket: 195 yuan / person

★ Definition of "elderly ticket": seniors aged 65 to 69 (enter the park with a valid ID card).

Night ticket 195 yuan/person

★ Children and adults over 1.1 meters tall;

Free of charge

★ Children under 1.1 meters in height (Each ticket-buying adult can bring one child under 1.1 meters in height);

★ Elders over 70 years old (including 70 years old) enter the park with valid ID cards;

★ The disabled persons holding the second-generation "Disability Certificate" issued by the National Disabled Persons' Federation are exempted from tickets. Those with disabilities who are blind, mentally handicapped, and unable to take care of themselves must be accompanied by family members (ticket purchase required).

Note

★ Tourists can only enjoy one kind of preferential policy, and those who are eligible for multiple discounts will be counted as the lowest discount.

★ The full-price ticket is valid for 7 days; the discount tickets are valid for the same day

Transportation
Happy Valley Beijing features a mini train that encircles the outer rim of the park which offers scenic sights with one station located on the southeastern corner of the park adjacent to the park entrance.

The park is adjacent to the Beijing Happy Valley station on Line 7 of the Beijing Subway, providing quick access.

Bus

From Tiananmen, take No. 52 to Jinsong Qiao East Station, then take No. 41 to Houpeng Bridge South Station and get off; or take 674, 680, 687 to the terminal station, OCT South Station, and get off to the north just a few minutes walk. Get off at 740, 840, 29, 743, 753, 683, and 801 at Hongyan Bridge, Zinan Home, and Beigong East Station and walk for 20 minutes.

Self-driving

Beijing Happy Valley is located at the southeast corner of the Sifang Bridge on the East Fourth Ring Road in Beijing, a straight distance of 10.2 kilometers from Tiananmen Square, 10 minutes to the central business district (CBD) of Beijing, and 5 minutes to the entrance of Jingjintang Expressway.

Thematic Leisure Activities
 Maximal Exercise Festival
 Chinese Spring Festival
 Water-Splashing Festival
 International Magic Day

References

External links
Photos of Happy Valley 

2006 establishments in China
Amusement parks in Beijing
Amusement parks opened in 2006
Beijing